Agga and other capitalizations may refer to:

Arts and media
 Agga, a character in Timewyrm: Genesys, a Doctor Who novel
 Aunt Agga, an agony aunt persona used by Lillian Too, a feng shui expert
 Agga Olsen, European actress whose best known work is Smilla's Sense of Snow, a 1997 film
 Spaceship Agga Ruter, a 1998 hentai film series directed by Masaki Kajishima

Science and technology

Biology
aggA, a gene locus found in plant-associated bacteria that agglutinate; see agglutination (biology)
 Agalinis gattingeri, the roundstem false foxglove plant (USDA code: AGGA)
 AGGA, a common DNA sequence

Other uses in science and technology
 Silver gallium (AgGa), an ion that forms many compounds, some of which are used in lasers
 Aggregate access, an Internet protocol formally known as Aggregate Server Access Protocol

Burmese society
Agga means 'chief' or 'foremost' in Burmese, and may refer to:
 Agga Maha Thiri Thudhamma (Grand Commander) of the Thiri Thudhamma Thingaha (Order of Truth)
 Agga Maha Thray Sithu (Grand Commander) of the Pyidaungsu Sithu Thingaha (Order of the Union of Burma)
 Agga Maha Thray Sithu Agga Maha Thiri Thudhamma, also known as Sao Shwe Thaik, first president of the Union of Burma

Other uses
 Agga, variant spelling of Aga of Kish, a king of Kish
 Auki Gwaunaru'u Airport (ICAO: AGGA), in the Solomon Islands

See also
 Aga (disambiguation)
 Agadoo doo doo, a nonsense lyric from 1984 novelty song Agadoo
 Agar, a gelatinous substance used in confectionery and microbiology
 AGG (disambiguation)
 AGGAGG, the Shine-Dalgarno sequence of DNA base pairs. AGGAGGA is the Escherichia coli Shine-Dalgarno sequence
 Aggar (disambiguation)
 Agge (disambiguation)
 Agger (disambiguation)
 Agha (disambiguation)